Ole Kanda Naal (English:The day I met her) is a 2021 Malayalam romantic film directed by Musthafa Gutz. The movie has debutants Jothish Jo and Krishnapriya in the lead roles along with Santhosh Keezhattoor, Shivaji Guruvayoor and Neena Kurup in the main supporting roles. Produced by Lata Sajeev under the banner of Gendrend Frames, the movie was released on 19 March 2021.

Synopsis
The movie takes place in a campus in Palakkad district of Kerala. A Muslim girl comes from an Orthodox family to join the college and falls in love with her collegemate Adhi. This is followed by a serious of events.

Cast
Jyothish Goe
Krishnapriya
Santhosh Keezhattoor
Shivaji Guruvayur
Neena Kurup

References

2020s Malayalam-language films
2021 films